The California Department of Forestry and Fire Protection (CAL FIRE) is the fire department of the California Natural Resources Agency in the U.S. state of California. It is responsible for fire protection in various areas under state responsibility totaling 31 million acres, as well as the administration of the state's private and public forests. In addition, the department provides varied emergency services in 36 of the state's 58 counties via contracts with local governments. The department's current director is Joe Tyler, who was appointed March 4, 2022, by Governor of California Gavin Newsom.

Operations 

CAL FIRE's foremost operational role is to fight and prevent wildfire on 31 million acres of state forestland. The organization works in both suppression and prevention capacities on state land, and offers emergency services of various kinds in 36 out of California's 58 counties, through contracts with local governments. The organization also assists in response to a wide range of disasters and incidents, including earthquakes, water rescues, and hazardous material spills. The organization manages eight Demonstration State Forests for timber production, recreation, and research. 

In conjunction with the California Department of Corrections and Rehabilitation, CAL FIRE uses thousands of incarcerated firefighters at 44 conservation camps throughout the state on fire prevention, fire suppression, and various maintenance and conservation projects. CAL FIRE works with employees of the California Conservation Corps since that agency's creation in a partnership for fire suppression duties, logistics and forestry management. CCC corpsmembers are involved in job training programs as Type 1 Hand Crew firefighters, supervised by CAL FIRE personnel, in increasing prevalence to offset CDCR inmates as the incarcerated firefighter program is closed. Programs to control wood boring insects and diseases of trees are under forestry programs managed by CAL FIRE. The vehicle fleet is managed from an office in Davis, California.

Organizational structure
The largest and most visible part of CAL FIRE operations is fire protection. Operations are divided into 21 operational units, which geographically follow county lines. Each unit consists of the area of one or more counties. Operational units are grouped under either the North Region or South Region.

The Office of the State Fire Marshal (OSFM) is the CAL FIRE program that protects life and property through the development and application of fire prevention, engineering, training and education, and enforcement. As part of this mission, OSFM establishes a fire-safe environment for the people of California, which serves as a foundation for local agencies to build on as they strive to meet their specific goals.

There are two CAL FIRE training centers. The original academy is the CAL FIRE Training Center in Ione, east of Sacramento. The second academy is at the Ben Clark Training Center in Riverside. Both centers host the Fire Fighter Academy (FFA). All CAL FIRE Fire Protection employees go through this academy once they become permanent employees. The Company Officer Academy (COA) is only held in Ione. All new company officers (Engineer, Captain, Forester I, etc.) attend this academy.

Rank structure

Leadership 

The uniformed executive staff of CAL FIRE includes the following individuals.

 Director: Joe Tyler
 Chief Deputy Director: Chris Anthony
 State Fire Marshal: Mike Richwine
 Assistant State Fire Marshal: Wendy Collins
 Deputy Director, Fire Protection: Curtis Brown
 Deputy Director, Resource Management: Matthew Reischman
 Deputy Director of Cooperative Fire Protection: Bret Gouvea
 Deputy Director, Communications (Acting): Nick Schuler
 Southern Region Chief: Dave Fulcher
 Northern Region Chief: George Morris III

Pay 
As of 2017, median pay for full time firefighters (which includes base pay, special pay, overtime and benefits) is $148,000.

Representation
Firefighters employed by the California Department of Forestry and Fire Protection are represented by IAFF affiliate, CAL FIRE Local 2881, which represents 5,700 members within CAL FIRE Local 2881 and is also associated with the California Professional Firefighters (CPF) and the International Association of Firefighters (IAFF).

Operational units
Operational units are organizations designed to address fire suppression over a geographic area. They vary widely in size and terrain.

For example, Lassen-Modoc-Plumas Operational Unit encompasses three rural counties and consists of eight fire stations, one Helitack Base, three conservation camps and an inmate firefighter training center. Fire suppression resources include 13 front-line fire engines, 1 helicopter, 3 bulldozers and 14 inmate fire crews. The unit shares an interagency emergency command center with federal agencies including the US Forest Service, National Park Service, and the Bureau of Land Management. An interagency center contributes to economies of scale, supports cooperation, and lends itself to a more seamless operation. The area has fragmented jurisdictions across a large rural area along the Nevada and Oregon state lines.

Riverside Operational Unit by itself is one of the largest fire departments in the nation, with 95 fire stations and about 230 pieces of equipment. The Riverside Operational Unit operates the Riverside County Fire Department under contract as well operates eighteen city fire departments and one community services district fire department. Nine of these stations belong to the state, with rest owned by the respective local government entity. The unit operates its own emergency command center in Perris. Terrain served includes urban and suburban areas of the Inland Empire and communities in the metropolitan Palm Springs area. The area includes forested mountains, the Colorado River basin, the Mojave Desert and Interstate 10.

The counties of Marin (MRN), Kern (KRN), Santa Barbara (SBC), Ventura (VNC), Los Angeles (LAC) and Orange (ORC) are paid by CAL FIRE to provide fire protection to state responsibility areas within those counties rather than CAL FIRE providing direct fire protection, and are commonly known as the "Contract Counties".

Lawmakers in Sacramento have mandated that every operational unit develop and implement an annual fire management plan. The plan will develop cooperation and community programs to reduce damage from, and costs of, fires in California. One metric used by fire suppression units is initial attack success: fires stopped by the initial resources, (equipment and people,) sent to the incident.

Northern Region units and identifiers
Amador-El Dorado Unit – AEU / 2700 (Including Sacramento and Alpine Counties)
Butte Unit – BTU / 2100
Humboldt-Del Norte Unit – HUU / 1200
Lassen-Modoc-Plumas Unit – LMU / 2200 (Including Plumas County as of June 2008)
Mendocino Unit – MEU / 1100
Nevada-Yuba-Placer Unit – NEU / 2300 (Including Sutter and Sierra Counties)
San Mateo-Santa Cruz Unit – CZU / 1700
Santa Clara Unit – SCU / 1600 (including Contra Costa, Alameda, Santa Clara and parts of San Joaquin, and Stanislaus Counties)
Shasta-Trinity Unit – SHU / 2400
Siskiyou Unit – SKU / 2600
Sonoma-Lake-Napa Unit – LNU / 1400 (including: Solano, Yolo, Colusa Counties)
Tehama-Glenn Unit – TGU / 2500

Southern Region units and identifiers
Fresno-Kings Unit – FKU / 4300
Madera-Mariposa-Merced Unit – MMU / 4200
Riverside Unit -RRU / 3100
San Benito-Monterey Unit – BEU/ 4600
San Bernardino Unit – BDU / 3500 (Including Inyo and Mono Counties)
San Diego Unit -MVU / 3300 (Including Imperial County)
San Luis Obispo Unit – SLU / 3400
Tulare Unit – TUU / 4100
Tuolumne-Calaveras Unit  – TCU / 4400 (Including portions of San Joaquin, Stanislaus, and Alpine counties)

Equipment

Apparatus 
CAL FIRE uses various apparatus to accomplish their daily responses.  Engines fall under two categories, either being state-owned — mostly wildland, or city/county owned, which CAL FIRE operates under contract.

For the wildland portion, most engines are manufactured with West-Mark or Westates (now American Truck & Fire Apparatus) bodies on an International chassis.  Commonly seen models of wildland engines include the Model 14, and 15. CAL FIRE Models 24 and 25 were test-bed models, with only a few of each model fielded.  The newest versions of these engines are CAL FIRE model 34 (4WD) and 35 (2WD), manufactured by Placer Fire Equipment, Rosenbauer, and HME.  Model 34/35's are currently being fielded statewide.  As of 2009 Model 35's have been discontinued and Model 34's from BME Apparatus are the new standard.  Fact sheets on all of CAL FIRE's current-service Type 3 (wildland) engine models can be found on the CAL FIRE Web site under Mobile Equipment.

Air program 

CAL FIRE owns its own fleet of air tankers, tactical aircraft and helicopters, which are managed under the Aviation Management Program. Additional aviation resources are leased by the department when needed. All of the fixed wing aircraft, while owned by CAL FIRE, are piloted and maintained by DynCorp International. The CAL FIRE Air Program is one of the largest non-military air programs in the country, consisting of twenty-three (23) Grumman S-2 Tracker (S-2T version) 1,200 gallon fixed wing turboprop air tankers, fourteen (14) North American Rockwell OV-10 Bronco fixed wing turboprop air tactical aircraft and twelve (12) Bell UH-1H Super Huey helicopters. CAL FIRE has also now begun operating new Sikorsky S-70i Firehawk helicopters for aerial firefighting support including water drops and is planning to acquire up to twelve (12) of these rotorcraft to replace the aging Bell UH-1H Super Huey fleet.  From the thirteen (13) air attack and ten (10) helitack bases located statewide, aircraft can reach most fires within 20 minutes.

Aircraft are a prominent feature of CAL FIRE, especially during the summer fire season. Both fixed- and rotary-wing aircraft are employed. Helicopters (also known as rotorcraft or rotary wing aircraft) are used to transport firefighting "Helitack Crews" into fire areas. They also drop water and retardant chemicals on fires. Fixed-wing aircraft are used for command, observation, and to drop retardant chemicals on fires.

CAL FIRE contracted in the past with 10 Tanker Air Carrier for three years' of exclusive use of their McDonnell Douglas DC-10-10 heavy air tanker known as Tanker 910 for aerial firefighting at a cost of $5 million per year. Additional access was also provided to DC-10-30 air tankers, being Tanker 911 and Tanker 912. In 2014 Tanker 910 was retired; however, 10 Tanker Air Carrier continues to currently operate several DC-10-30 air tankers.

On October 7, 2014, a CAL FIRE S-2T air tanker crashed while fighting the Dog Rock Fire in Yosemite National Park. The pilot was killed.

Communications 
CAL FIRE uses several enterprise IT systems to manage operations. Altaris CAD, a computer-assisted dispatch system made by Northrop Grumman, is employed by each unit's emergency command center (ECC) to track available resources and assignments. This is made possible through the use of an automatic vehicle locating (AVL) system which provides vehicle location, data communication, and dispatching through a mobile data computer (MDC) and a multi-network switching system in over 1200 vehicles statewide. Each operational unit has a stand-alone system which includes detailed address and mapping information.

In popular culture
Fire Country is an American drama television series in which a young convict volunteers for the Conservation Camp Program and assists Cal Fire.

See also

California Conservation Corps
California Department of Parks and Recreation
FIRESCOPE

References

External links

 
Fire departments in California
Firefighting in California
Emergency services in California
Forestry
Forestry and Fire Protection
State forestry agencies in the United States
State environmental protection agencies of the United States
Wildfire suppression agencies
Aerial firefighting
Government agencies established in 1905
1905 establishments in California